The 351st Reconnaissance Aviation Squadron (Serbo-Croatian:  / 351. извиђачка авијацијска ескадрила) was an aviation squadron of Yugoslav Air Force established in April 1961 at Tuzla military air base.

History
Squadron was formed as part of 103rd Reconnaissance Aviation Regiment equipped with US-made Lockheed RT/IT-33A Shooting Star jet-trainer aircraft equipped for aerial reconnaissance. In 1966 squadron was disbanded and its equipment and personnel were passed to 350th Reconnaissance Aviation Squadron of same regiment.

By order from August 29, 1973 351st Reconnaissance Aviation Squadron was reestablished with 82nd Aviation Brigade at Cerklje airport. It was equipped with new domestic-made Soko Jastreb light-attack jet aircraft in IJ-21 reconnaissance version. In 1984 the first Orao attack aircraft in the IJ-22 reconnaissance version were introduced with this squadron. This was the first squadron of Yugoslav Air Force equipped with new Orao aircraft. In 1985 all Jastreb aircraft were replaced with Orao.

The squadron took part in first combat operations during the war in Slovenia and Croatia later since beginning of Yugoslav wars in 1991.
 
351st Reconnaissance Aviation Squadron was evacuated from Slovenia to Željava Air Base, attached to 117th Fighter Aviation Regiment and later by order from August 30, 1991, disbanded, with equipment and personnel integrated into 352nd Reconnaissance Aviation Squadron.

Assignments
103rd Reconnaissance Aviation Regiment (1961−1966)
82nd Aviation Brigade/82nd Fighter-Bomber Aviation Regiment (1973−1978)
5th Aviation Corps (1978−1982)
82nd Aviation Brigade/82nd Fighter-Bomber Aviation Regiment (1982−1991)

Bases stationed
Tuzla Air Base (1961−1966)
Cerklje (1973−1991)
Željava Air Base

Equipment
Lockheed RT/IT-33A Shooting Star (1961–1966)
Soko IJ-21 Jastreb (1973–1985)
Soko IJ-22 Orao (1984–1991)

References

Yugoslav Air Force squadrons
Military units and formations established in 1961
Military units and formations disestablished in 1991